Scythia Minor or Lesser Scythia (Greek:) was a Roman province in late antiquity, corresponding to the lands between the Danube and the Black Sea, today's Dobruja divided between Romania and Bulgaria. It was detached from Moesia Inferior by the Emperor Diocletian to form a separate province sometime between 286 and 293 AD. The capital of province was Tomis (today Constanța). The province ceased to exist around 679–681, when the region was overrun by the Bulgars, which the Emperor Constantine IV was forced to recognize in 681.

Its governor held the title of praeses and its dux commanded two legions, Legio I Iovia and Legio II Herculia. The office of dux was replaced by that of quaestor exercitus, covering a wider area, in 536.

The indigenous population of Scythia Minor was Dacian and their material culture is apparent archaeologically into the sixth century. Roman villas have also been found. The cities were either ancient Greek foundations on the coast (like Tomis) or more recent Roman foundations on the Danube. Roman fortifications mostly date to the Tetrarchy or the Constantinian dynasty. Substantial repairs were made under Emperors Anastasius I and Justinian I, who granted the province fiscal immunity. By the fifth century, most of the troops stationed in Scythia were foederati of Germanic, Turkic, Hunnic or (perhaps) Slavic origin. They were a constant source of tension in the province.

Christianity flourished in Scythia in the fifth and sixth centuries. Numerous Christian inscriptions have been found. Already in the fourth century, there is evidence of martyr cults there. Churches typically had relic crypts. Several prominent theologians hailed from Scythia, including John Cassian, Dionysius Exiguus and the Scythian monks.

See also
List of ancient towns in Scythia Minor

References

Bibliography

Late Roman provinces
Provinces of the Byzantine Empire
Moesia
Scythia
Geography of ancient Thrace
 
Romanization of Southeastern Europe
Ancient history of Romania
History of Dobruja
Praetorian prefecture of the East
Ancient Bulgaria